South Carolina Highway 219 (SC 219) is a  highway in the U.S. state of South Carolina. The highway is designated on an east–west direction, from SC 34 in Newberry to U.S. Route 176 (US 176).

Route description

History

Major intersections

See also

References

External links

SC 219 at Virginia Highways' South Carolina Highways Annex

219
Transportation in Newberry County, South Carolina
Newberry, South Carolina